The 2002 World's Strongest Man was the 25th edition of the international World's Strongest Man competition, and was won by Mariusz Pudzianowski from Poland. The contest was held in Kuala Lampur, Malaysia.

Qualifying heats

Heat 1

events: Carry & Drag (Farmer's Walk & Drag Chain & Anchor), Weight Throw, Fingal's Fingers, Car Pull, Giant Log Lift for Reps, Atlas Stones

Heat 2

events: Carry & Flip (Farmer's Walk & Tyre Flip), Max Log Press, Fingal's Fingers, Lorry Pull, Basque Circle (Connan Circle), Atlas Stones

Heat 3

events: Carry & Drag (Farmer's Walk & Drag Chain & Anchor), Weight Throw, Fingal's Fingers, Car Pull, Basque Circle (Connan Circle), Atlas Stones

Heat 4

Carry & Flip (Farmer's Walk & Tyre Flip), Weight Throw, Fingal's Fingers, Car Pull, Giant Log Lift for Reps, Atlas Stones

Heat 5

events: Carry & Drag (Farmer's Walk & Drag Chain & Anchor), Max Log Press, Fingal's Fingers, Lorry Pull, Basque Circle (Connan Circle), Atlas Stones

Final results

References

External links
 Official site

2002 in sports
Sports competitions in Kuala Lumpur
World's Strongest Man